For the Summer Olympics, there are 20 venues that have been or will be used for archery.

References

Venues
 
Arch
Olympic venues